Adelotopus is a genus of beetles in the family Carabidae, containing the following species:

 Adelotopus adelaideae Baehr, 1997
 Adelotopus adustus Baehr, 1997
 Adelotopus aequus Baehr, 1997
 Adelotopus affinis Castelnau, 1867
 Adelotopus analis Macleay, 1871
 Adelotopus angustatus Baehr, 1997
 Adelotopus aphodioides Westwood, 1853
 Adelotopus apicalis Macleay, 1864
 Adelotopus aterrimus Baehr, 1997
 Adelotopus atrorufus Baehr, 1997
 Adelotopus bacillus Baehr, 1997
 Adelotopus bamagae Baehr, 1997
 Adelotopus basirufus Baehr, 1997
 Adelotopus bilyi Baehr, 2002
 Adelotopus bimaculatus Macleay, 1864
 Adelotopus brevior Baehr, 1997
 Adelotopus brevipennis Macleay, 1888
 Adelotopus brittoni Baehr, 1997
 Adelotopus browni Baehr, 1997
 Adelotopus calvus Baehr, 1997
 Adelotopus caniae Baehr, 1997
 Adelotopus celeripes Lea, 1910
 Adelotopus ciliatus Baehr, 1997
 Adelotopus clepsydra Baehr, 1997
 Adelotopus conicollis Baehr, 1997
 Adelotopus convexicollis Baehr, 1997
 Adelotopus convexus Baehr, 1997
 Adelotopus coriaceus Baehr, 1997
 Adelotopus cornutus Castelnau, 1867
 Adelotopus crassus Baehr, 1997
 Adelotopus cribricollis Baehr, 1997
 Adelotopus crucis Baehr, 1997
 Adelotopus cuneatus Baehr, 1997
 Adelotopus distinguendus Baehr, 1997
 Adelotopus doyeni Baehr, 1997
 Adelotopus dubius Baehr, 1997
 Adelotopus dytiscides Newman, 1842
 Adelotopus edithae Baehr, 1997
 Adelotopus elongatulus Macleay, 1888
 Adelotopus fasciatus Castelnau, 1867
 Adelotopus flavescens Baehr, 1997
 Adelotopus flavus Baehr, 1997
 Adelotopus foliaceus Baehr, 1997
 Adelotopus geminus Baehr, 1997
 Adelotopus gibbosus Baehr, 1997
 Adelotopus gippslandicus Baehr, 1997
 Adelotopus grossepunctatus Baehr, 1997
 Adelotopus gyrinoides Hope, 1834
 Adelotopus haemorrhoidalis Erichson, 1842
 Adelotopus houstoni Baehr, 1997
 Adelotopus howdenorum Baehr, 1997
 Adelotopus hydrobioides Westwood, 1853
 Adelotopus katherinei Baehr, 1997
 Adelotopus kurandae Baehr, 1997
 Adelotopus laevigatus Baehr, 2002
 Adelotopus laevis Macleay, 1888
 Adelotopus languidus Baehr, 1997
 Adelotopus laticaudatus Baehr, 1997
 Adelotopus laticollis Baehr, 1997
 Adelotopus latior Baehr, 1997
 Adelotopus latipalpis Baehr, 1997
 Adelotopus lawrencei Baehr, 1997
 Adelotopus linearis Macleay, 1888
 Adelotopus longiformis Baehr, 1997
 Adelotopus longus Baehr, 1997
 Adelotopus lucidus Baehr, 2002
 Adelotopus lunatus Baehr, 1997
 Adelotopus luteus Baehr, 1997
 Adelotopus macilentus Baehr, 1997
 Adelotopus maculipennis Macleay, 1871
 Adelotopus mainae Baehr, 1997
 Adelotopus marginicollis Baehr, 1997
 Adelotopus minor Baehr, 1997
 Adelotopus moluccensis Baehr, 2009
 Adelotopus montisatri Baehr, 1997
 Adelotopus montorum Baehr, 1997
 Adelotopus multipunctatus Baehr, 1997
 Adelotopus murrayanus Baehr, 1997
 Adelotopus nemosomoides Westwood, 1853
 Adelotopus nigricauda Baehr, 1997
 Adelotopus nitens Baehr, 1997
 Adelotopus nitidior Baehr, 1997
 Adelotopus obsoletus Baehr, 1997
 Adelotopus ooldeae Baehr, 1997
 Adelotopus ovatus Baehr, 1997
 Adelotopus palumae Baehr, 1997
 Adelotopus paroensis Castelnau, 1867
 Adelotopus parumpunctatus Baehr, 1997
 Adelotopus piceus Baehr, 1997
 Adelotopus politus Castelnau, 1867
 Adelotopus punctatissimus Baehr, 1997
 Adelotopus punctatus Castelnau, 1867
 Adelotopus puncticollis Notman, 1925
 Adelotopus punctulifer Baehr, 1997
 Adelotopus queenslandicus Baehr, 1997
 Adelotopus rubiginosus Newman, 1856
 Adelotopus rufescens Baehr, 1997
 Adelotopus rufocaudatus Baehr, 1997
 Adelotopus rufoguttatus (Blackburn, 1893)
 Adelotopus rufomarginatus Baehr, 1997
 Adelotopus rufozonatus Baehr, 1997
 Adelotopus rugaticollis Baehr, 2002
 Adelotopus scolytides Newman, 1842
 Adelotopus sedlaceki Baehr, 1997
 Adelotopus semilunatus Baehr, 1997
 Adelotopus seminitidus Baehr, 1997
 Adelotopus sericeus Baehr, 1997
 Adelotopus seriepunctatus Notman, 1925
 Adelotopus similis Baehr, 1997
 Adelotopus sinuaticollis Baehr, 1997
 Adelotopus sparsepunctatus Baehr, 1997
 Adelotopus substriatus Baehr, 1997
 Adelotopus tasmani Blackburn, 1901
 Adelotopus ulrichi Baehr, 1997
 Adelotopus unicolor Baehr, 1997
 Adelotopus variolosus Lea, 1910
 Adelotopus vicinus Castelnau, 1867
 Adelotopus victoriensis Baehr, 1997
 Adelotopus villosus Baehr, 1997
 Adelotopus virgatus Baehr, 1997
 Adelotopus wilochrae Baehr, 2002
 Adelotopus yorkensis Baehr, 1997
 Adelotopus zborowskii Baehr, 1997
 Adelotopus zonatus Castelnau, 1867

References

Pseudomorphinae